Vitalie Călugăreanu (born 6 October 1977, Cărpineni) is a journalist from the Republic of Moldova. He is a Chişinău-based journalist and talk-show host of Shadow Government, a program on Jurnal TV. Also, Călugăreanu is a correspondent for Deutsche Welle.

Biography
Vitalie Călugăreanu was born on 6 October 1977 in Cărpineni, Hânceşti District. Călugăreanu has a degree in journalism and communication sciences from the Moldova State University (1999).

Călugăreanu has worked for several newspapers and radio stations in Chişinău (Flux, radio Unda Libera, radio Noroc). Also, he has worked as a reporter for television station Antena 1 (Romania), Prima (news agency), Euro TV Moldova. He is a correspondent for Jurnalul Naţional and Deutsche Welle. Călugăreanu has been working for Jurnal TV since 2009.

Between 2000 and 2001 he was editor-in-chief of a Chişinău edition of Jurnalul Naţional, which ceased its activities because of financial reasons.

References

External links 
 Radio Free Europe, Eu fac jurnalistică și atît...
 VITALIE CĂLUGĂREANU: Îmi place să lucrez în echipe

1977 births
Living people
People from Hîncești District
Moldova State University alumni
Romanian people of Moldovan descent
Moldovan journalists
Male journalists
Jurnal Trust Media